The Norwegian vintage ship MV Granvin was built in 1931 at Mjellem & Karlsen Verft, in Bergen, Norway for Hardanger Sunnhordlandske Dampskipsselskap for local trade with freight, passengers and cars.

The vessel sailed in regular traffic in Hardanger between 1931 and 1987. Granvin is a typical representative of the local passenger vessel built between the wars for traffic between Bergen and hinterland.

In 1988, the vessel was acquired by Veteranskipslaget Fjordabåten with the a view to preservation. In 1988/89, the vessel was restored to her original appearance with funnel and large saloon below deck forward.

Bergen is the base port.

Specifications
Passengers: 80 (on day trips)
Speed: 10 knots 
Length: 89.9 feet 
Engine: 3 cyl. 2-stroke Wichmann 300 BHP

External links
Veteranskipslaget Fjordabåten (Norwegian language only)

Ships built in Bergen
Ships of Norway
1931 ships